Moses Pendleton (born March 28, 1949) is a choreographer, dancer and the artistic director of MOMIX. MOMIX is a dance company that he formed in 1981 as an offshoot of the Pilobolus, which he had co-founded while a senior at Dartmouth College in 1971.  He remained a full-time member with the company until 1980.  He choreographs dance sculptures that bring together acrobatics, gymnastics, mime, props, and film.

Early years
Born and raised on a dairy farm in Lyndonville, Vermont. Pendleton exhibited Holstein Friesians at the Caledonia County Fair.

He attended Dartmouth College, graduating in 1971 with a BA in English Literature. In that same year he co-founded Pilobolus, which won acclaim for its blend of acrobatics, body sculpture, and humor. Pierre Cardin presented the group on Broadway in 1977. Pendleton left the company to start MOMIX four years later.

MOMIX
Pendleton performed a solo dance called "MOMIX" with Pilobolus at the 1980 Winter Olympics at Lake Placid. The following year MOMIX became the name of the company he founded with Alison Becker Chase.

Over the past 40 years MOMIX repertoire has included full-evening works such as Passion, with a score by Peter Gabriel; In Orbit; Baseball; Opus Cactus; Lunar Sea; MOMIX: Remix; Botanica; Alchemy and the company's latest creation, Alice.

Inspiration and ideology
Pendleton takes much of his inspiration for his work from the natural world, plants, animals and minerals.  On stage, portrays resemble sunflowers and marigolds.  Pendleton states, "we're less of a dance company than a physical, visual theater, using props and costumes to create fascinating pictures."

Choreography and performance
Pendleton has been active as a choreographer and a performer for other companies.
	
 1979 - choreographed and performed in the "Integrale Erik Satie" staged by the Paris Opera Ballet, including  a revival of the 1924 Dadaist ballet "Relache."
1980 - choreographed the Closing Ceremonies for the 1980 Winter Olympics at Lake Placid. 
1980 - remounts "Relache" for the Joffrey Ballet in New York
1982 - creates the role of the Fool for Yuri Lyubimov's production of Mussorgsky's "Khovanshchina" at Milan's La Scala 
1982 - stages and performs in the Deutsche Opera's production of "Tutuguri", based on the writings of Antonin Artaud, in Berlin.
1985 - choreographs Stravinsky's "Pulcinella" for the Ballet de Nancy
1987 - choreographs Rameau's "Platee" for the Spoleto Festival USA
1988 - supplies choreographic "mise-en-scene" for a revival of Cocteau's "Les Maries de la Tour Eiffel" for the inauguration of the Florence Gould Hall at the Alliance Francaise in New York
1989 - choreographs "AccorDION" for the Vorbuhne-Zurich Theatre
1991 - "Passion" with MOMIX
1993 - contributes the choreography for Lina Wertmüller's production of "Carmen" with the Munich State Opera
1994 - "Baseball" with MOMIX
1997 - "Sputnik" with MOMIX
2000 - choreographs (with Danny Ezralow and David Parsons) "Aeros" with the Romanian Olympic gymnastics team
2002 - "Opus Cactus" with MOMIX
2004 - choreographs 12 weeks of Italian RAI-TV’s number-one-rated live variety show, Fiorello  
2005 - "Lunar Sea" with MOMIX
2008 - choreographs "Picarte" for Diana Vishneva of the Kirov Ballet
2008 - "F.L.O.W." for Diana Vishneva
2008 - Choreographs for Mercedes Benz at Frankfurt Auto Show
2009 - "Botanica" with MOMIX
2013 - "Alchemy" with MOMIX
2013 - Choreographs "Doves of Peace" for Sochi Olympics Opening Ceremony 
2015 - "Viva Momix Forever" with MOMIX in honor of 35th Anniversary Season 
2015 - Choreographs for Dubai National Day
2018 - Choreographs for Pirelli Calendar Event in NYC
2019 - "Alice" with MOMIX 
2020 - "MOMIX 40" Celebration of 40th Anniversary

Film and television
1970s - participation in several "Dance in America" and "Great Performances" PBS specials with Pilobolus
1970s - appearances on "To Tell the Truth," "The Tonight Show," and "Sesame Street"
1982 - "Moses Pendleton Presents Moses Pendleton" for ABC Arts, winner of a CINE Golden Eagle award
1984 - Julian Lennon's "Too Late for Goodbyes" directed by Sam Peckinpah 
1989 - choreography for Prince's "Batdance" music video for the movie "Batman"
1991 - choreography appears in the film "FXII"
1991 - co-stars with Charles Dutoit in the Emmy Award winning Rhombus Media film of Mussorgsky's "Pictures at an Exhibition" with the Montreal Symphony Orchestra.
1990s - choreographs rock videos for the bands White Lion and Shadowfax, and for singer Cathy Dennis.
1990s - directs numerous special programs for Antenne ll in France and RAI Television in Italy
1993 - "Carmen" for Munich State Opera
1994 - contributes to the 3D IMAX film "Imagine" released at IMAX theaters worldwide
2003 - "White Widow," danced by Emily Patterson and excerpted from MOMIX's In Orbit show, is included in the Robert Altman film The Company 
2004 - choreographs 12 weeks of Italian RAI-TV’s number-one-rated live variety show, Fiorello

Awards and distinctions
1972 - with Pilobolus, recipient of the Scotsman Award at the Edinburgh Festival 
1975 - with Pilobolus, recipient of the Berlin Critics Prize
1977 - appointed a Guggenheim Fellow 
1994 - receives the Gold Medal of the Arena di Verona Festival as director of MOMIX
1998 - recipient of the Connecticut Commission on the Arts' Governor's Award. 
1999 - recipient of the Positano Choreographic Award 
2002 - receives the American Choreography Award (with Daniel Parsons and Daniel Ezralow) from the Academy of Dance on Film for Outstanding Achievement in Television, Variety or Special (for "Aeros: Illusion of Flight")
2010 - recipient of an honorary Doctorate of Fine Arts from the University of the Arts in Philadelphia and keynote speaker at Commencement ceremonies
2012 - appointed Accademico of the Accademia Filarmonica Romana (established 1821), the first choreographer ever to receive such a distinction.

Other projects
An avid photographer, Pendleton's work has been exhibited in London, Milan, Montreal and Aspen, and Rome. Pendleton is the subject of the book Salto di Gravita by Lisavetta Scarbi (in Italian, 1999).
Pendleton was a 1998 recipient of the Connecticut Commission on the Arts' Governor's Award.

Notes

Sources
Chamber Dance Company (includes photo)
PBS Documentary Series (includes video)

External links
MOMIX website
Selby/Artists MGMT – Artist Representation
Archive film of Ocellus with choreography by Moses Pendleton, Robby Barnett, Lee Harris, Jonathan Wolken performed in 1985 at Jacob's Pillow
Oxford Reference

American choreographers
Living people
People from Lyndonville, Vermont
1949 births